Komplett AS is a Norwegian e-commerce company with nine webshops in 3 countries in Scandinavia. The main part of their product assortment is computers and components, but they have also expanded to include photographic, Hi-Fi, TV, gaming and white goods. The headquarters are located in Sandefjord, Norway where the company was founded. In addition to their Norwegian operations, Komplett also runs webshops in Sweden and Denmark, and distribution in Norway through the channels Norek and Itegra.
Komplett has three call centers for sales and support in Sandefjord, Norway and Gothenburg, Sweden.
Komplett has a distribution center and warehouses in Sandefjord, Norway. Company turnover in 2015, was 7.3 billion NOK with 800 employees and 1 800,000 active customers.

History

Awards 
Komplett was awarded the Farmand Prize (awarded by Farmand Activum) for best website in 2007 and they won the Gulltaggen the same year in the category Interactive Advertiser of the Year 2007.

References

Computer companies of Norway
Wholesalers of Norway
Companies formerly listed on the Oslo Stock Exchange